Glossochilus is a genus of flowering plants belonging to the family Acanthaceae.

Its native range is Southern Africa.

Species:
 Glossochilus burchellii Nees

References

Acanthaceae
Acanthaceae genera